Ireland competed at the 2014 Summer Youth Olympics, in Nanjing, China from 16 August to 28 August 2014.

Medalists

Athletics

Ireland qualified five athletes.

Qualification Legend: Q=Final A (medal); qB=Final B (non-medal); qC=Final C (non-medal); qD=Final D (non-medal); qE=Final E (non-medal)

Boys
Field Events

Girls
Track & road events

Field events

Boxing

Ireland qualified three boxers based on its performance at the 2014 AIBA Youth World Championships

Boys

Girls

Canoeing

Ireland qualified one boat based on its performance at the 2013 World Junior Canoe Sprint and Slalom Championships.

Boys

Equestrian

Ireland qualified a rider.

Golf

Ireland qualified one team of two athletes based on the 8 June 2014 IGF Combined World Amateur Golf Rankings.

Individual

Team

Rowing

Ireland qualified one boat based on its performance at the 2013 World Rowing Junior Championships.

Qualification Legend: FA=Final A (medal); FB=Final B (non-medal); FC=Final C (non-medal); FD=Final D (non-medal); SA/B=Semifinals A/B; SC/D=Semifinals C/D; R=Repechage

Swimming

Ireland qualified three swimmers.

Boys

Girls

References

2014 in Irish sport
Ireland at the Youth Olympics
Nations at the 2014 Summer Youth Olympics